The given name Erika, Erica, Ericka, or Ereka is a feminine form of Eric, deriving from the Old Norse name Eiríkr (or Eríkr in Eastern Scandinavia due to monophthongization). The first element, ei- is derived either from the older Proto-Norse *aina(z), meaning "one, alone, unique", as in the form Æinrikr explicitly, or from *aiwa(z) "long time, eternity". The second element -ríkr stems either from *ríks "king, ruler" (cf. Gothic reiks) or from the therefrom derived *ríkijaz "kingly, powerful, rich". The name is thus usually taken to mean "sole ruler, monarch" or "eternal ruler, ever powerful".

It is a common name in many Western societies. It is also a popular given name for women in Japan (even though its origin has nothing in common with the Nordic roots of the Western version). Erica is also the name of a genus of approximately 860 species of flowering plants in the family Ericaceae, commonly known as "heaths" or "heathers" in English, and is the Latin word for "heather".

People with the name 
Érika Alcocer Luna (born 1974), Mexican singer, winner of the second generation of La Academia
Erika Alexander (born 1969), American actress
Erica Alfridi (born 1968), Italian race walker
Erika Anderson, American actress
Erika Araki (born 1984), Japanese national volleyball team captain
Erykah Badu (born 1971), American singer-songwriter, record producer, activist, and actress
Erica Banks, American rapper
Erica Bartolina (born 1980), American pole vaulter
Erika Billeter (1927–2011), German-born Swiss curator, art historian, writer, and museum director
Erica Blasberg (1984–2010),  American professional golfer
Erica Bougard (born 1993), American heptathlete
Erika Buenfil (born 1963), Mexican actress
Erika von Brockdorff (1911–1943), German resistance fighter during the Second World War
Erica Campbell, (born 1972), American singer most famous from Mary Mary
Erika Christensen (born 1982), American actress
Érika Coimbra (born 1980), Brazilian volleyball player
Erica Cornejo, Argentine ballet dancer
Erika Cosby, American painter and daughter of Bill Cosby
Erika Costell (born 1993), American YouTuber, model, and singer
Erika Cremer (1900–1996), German physicist
Erika Doss (fl. 1980s–2020s), professor of American Studies at the University of Notre Dame
Erica Durance (born 1978), Canadian actress
Erika Eleniak (born 1969), American actress and Playboy Playmate
Erika Ender (born 1974), Panamanian singer, songwriter and actress
Erika Fisch (born 1934), German athlete
Erika Fuchs (1906–2005), German translator
Erica Garner (1990-2017), American activist
Erica Gavel (born 1991), Canadian wheelchair basketball player
Erika González (born 1972), Mexican freestyle swimmer
Erika Hamden, US astrophysicist and Assistant Professor
Erika Hansen (born 1970), American swimmer
Erika Harlacher (born 1990), American voice actress
Erika Harold (born 1980), American attorney, politician, and 2003 Miss America
Erika Henningsen (born 1992), American actress
Erika Heynatz (1975-), Australian model, actress, singer and television personality
Erica Hill (born 1976), American journalist
Erica Jarder (born 1986), Swedish long jumper
Erika Jayne, dance/electronica artist
Erica Johansson (born 1974), Swedish long jumper
Erica Jong (born 1942), American author
Erika Kaljusaar (born 1956), Estonian actress
Erika Kinsey (born 1988), Swedish high jumper
Erika Kirpu (born 1992), Estonian épée fencer
Erika Liebman (1738–1803), Swedish poet
Erika deLone, (born 1972), retired American professional tennis player
Erica Lindbeck, American voice actress
Erica Luttrell (born 1982), Canadian voice actress
Erika Mann (1905–1969), German writer, the daughter of Thomas Mann
Erika Mann (politician) (born 1950), German politician
Erika Marín-Spiotta, Spanish-born biogeochemist and ecosystem ecologist
Erika Mitchell is the real name of author E. L. James (born 1963)
Erica Morningstar (born 1989), Canadian swimmer
Erika Nara, Japanese Paralympic swimmer
Erica Nego, beauty queen, model, and businesswoman
Érika Olivera (born 1976), Chilean marathon runner
Erica Packer (born 1975), Australian singer and model
Erica Parsons (1998-2011), American child abuse and murder victim
Erika Pluhar (born 1939), Austrian actress, singer and author
Erica Rose (born 1982), American long-distance swimmer
Erika Rudolf (born 1954), Hungarian high jumper
Erica Sakurazawa (born 1963), Japanese manga author
Érika or Érika Cristiano dos Santos (born 1988), Brazilian football defender
Erika Sawajiri (沢尻 エリカ, born 1986), Japanese gravure model, singer and actress
 Erika Schmutz (born 1973), Canadian former Wheelchair rugby player and power engineer
Erika Slezak (born 1946), American actress best known for her long-running role as Viki Davidson on One Life to Live
Érika de Souza (born 1982), Brazilian basketball player
Erika Steinbach (born 1943), German politician
Erica Sullivan (swimmer) (born 2000), American swimmer
Erika Toda (戸田 恵梨香, born 1988), Japanese actress
Erika Umeda (born 1991), Japanese singer and model, former member of Cute
Erika Wendt (1917–2003), German WWII spy
Erika Yazawa (born 1990), Japanese gravure model, actress and member of Idoling!!!
Erica Yuen (born 1980), Hong Kong politician, actress, and presenter
Erika Zavaleta, American ecologist and evolutionary biologist

Fictional characters 
Erika, the eponymous character of the German marching song "Erika"
Erika (Pokémon), a character in the video game series Pokémon
Erika (Underworld), a character in the film Underworld
Erika, a character in the anime series Tōshō Daimos
Erika, the titular pauper of Barbie as the Princess and the Pauper
Erica Ainsworth, a character in the manga series Fate/kaleid liner Prisma Illya
, a character in the anime series Anime-Gataris
Erika Berger, a character in the novel series Millennium
, a character in the light novel series The Irregular at Magic High School
Erica Davidson, a character in the television series Prisoner
Erica Farrell, a character in the media franchise Degrassi
Erica Fontaine, a character in the media franchise Sakura Taisen
Erika Ford, a character in the television series Friends
, a character in the visual novel series Umineko When They Cry
Erica Goldberg, a character in the television series The Goldbergs
Erica Hahn, a character in the television series Grey's Anatomy
Erica Hartmann, a character in the media franchise Strike Witches
, a character in the anime series Girls und Panzer
, a character in the anime series HeartCatch PreCure!
, a character in the webcomic Megatokyo
Erica Kane, a character in the soap opera All My Children
Erika Kohut, protagonist of the novel The Piano Teacher
, a character in the visual novel Fortune Arterial
Erica Reyes, a character in the television series Teen Wolf
Erica Strange, a character in the television series Being Erica
Erica Sinclair, a character in the Netflix Series Stranger Things
, a character in the manga series Wolf Girl and Black Prince
, a character in the anime series Sakura Quest
, a character in the anime series Ginga e Kickoff!!
, a character in the anime series Tsuritama
Erica Yurken, protagonist of the novel Hating Alison Ashley

See also
Erika (disambiguation)
Frederica (given name)

References

Japanese feminine given names
English-language feminine given names
Swedish feminine given names
German feminine given names
Swiss feminine given names
English feminine given names
Finnish feminine given names
Danish feminine given names
Norwegian feminine given names
Icelandic feminine given names
Scandinavian feminine given names
Spanish feminine given names
Portuguese feminine given names
Italian feminine given names
Estonian feminine given names